Georg Alfred Schumann (25 October 1866 – 23 May 1952) was a German composer and director of the Sing-Akademie zu Berlin.

Life 
Schumann was born at Königstein. He was the son of Clemens Schumann (1839–1918) and the older brother of Camillo Schumann. He first studied the violin and organ with his father and grandfather, and was taught by Friedrich Baumfelder, a well-known German composer, pianist, and conductor of his day. He later was a student at the Leipzig Conservatory for seven years, conducted an orchestra at Danzig from 1891–1896 and from 1896-1899 the orchestra at Bremen. In 1900 he became professor and director at the Sing-Akademie zu Berlin. In 1907 he became a member of the Prussian Academy of Arts, in 1918 vice-president and finally in 1934 President.

Works (selection) 
 Symphonies:
 Symphony No. 1, "Preis-Symphonie" in B minor (1887)
 Symphony No. 2 in F minor, Op. 42 (1905)
 Other orchestral works:
 Amor und Psyche, Op. 3 (1888) for soloists, choir and orchestra
 Celebration overture in C minor, Op.48 (1939) 
 Joy of Life overture, Op. 54 (1911)
 Im Ringen um ein Ideal, symphonic poem Op. 66 (1916)
 Orchestral Variations on Vetter Michel, Op. 74 (1930)
 Ouvertüre zu einem Drama, Op. 45 (1906)
 Serenade for Large Orchestra, Op. 34 (1902)
 Symphonische Variationen über den Choral Wer nur den lieben Gott lässt walten, Op. 24 (1900)
 Variations and Gigue on Handel's "The Harmonious Blacksmith" for large orchestra, Op. 72 (1925)
 Choral music:
 Ruth op. 50 (1908)
 Songs of Hiob, Op. 60 (1914)
Chamber Music
 Cello Sonata in E minor, Op. 19 (1898)
 Piano Quartet in F minor, Op. 29 (1901)
 Piano Quintet No. 1 in E minor, Op. 18 (1898)
 Piano Quintet No. 2 in F minor, Op. 49 (1909)
 Piano Trio No. 1 in F major, Op. 25 (1900)
 Piano Trio No. 2 in F major, Op. 62 (1915)
 Piano Music:
 Drei Stücke, Op. 1
 Stimmungsbilder, Op. 2 (1886)
 Traumbilder, Op. 4 (1890)
 Improvisationen, Op. 7 (1892)
 Drei Stücke, Op. 23
 Sechs Fantasien, Op. 36
 Ballade, Op. 65

Recordings
 Piano Trios Nos. 1 & 2. Recorded by the Münchner Klaviertrio and released on cpo  (777 712-2) in 2011.
 Symphony No. 1 (Preis-Symphonie) and Serenade for Large Orchestra were released on cpo 3066793 in 2012.
 Lieder. Recorded by Mary Nelson (soprano) and Mark Ford (piano) and released on Stone Records (B077MT8H1C) in 2017.

External links

Georg Schumann Society, Berlin

1866 births
1952 deaths
19th-century German composers
20th-century German composers
Commanders Crosses of the Order of Merit of the Federal Republic of Germany
German male composers
People from Königstein, Saxony
People from the Kingdom of Saxony
Academic staff of the Prussian Academy of Arts